The Barber is a 2014 American thriller film directed by Basel Owies and starring Scott Glenn.  It is Owies's feature directorial debut.

Cast
Scott Glenn as Eugene Van Wingerdt / Francis Allen Visser
Chris Coy as John McCormack
Kristen Hager as Audrey Bennett
Stephen Tobolowsky as Chief Gary Hardaway
Max Arciniega as Luis Ramirez
Olivia Taylor Dudley as Kelli
Lydia Hearst as Melissa
Tim Dezam as Capt. Phil Baroni 
Valorie Hubbard as Grace
Thomas Calabro as Thomas McCormack

Release
The film premiered at the Busan International Film Festival on October 3, 2014.  It was then released in limited theaters and on VOD on March 27, 2015.

Reception
The film has a 20% rating on Rotten Tomatoes.  Oktay Ege Kozak of IndieWire graded the film a D.  Tirdad Derakhshani of The Philadelphia Inquirer awarded the film two and a half stars out of four.

Dennis Harvey of Variety gave the film a negative review and wrote "An apparent serial-killer-wannabe tracks down his would-be mentor in this underwhelming thriller."

References

External links
 
 

American thriller films
2014 thriller films
2010s English-language films
2010s American films